The Zeeland Library (Zeeuwse Bibliotheek) in Middelburg, Netherlands, is the official library of Zeeland and the academic library of University College Roosevelt.

History
The library was founded in 1985, when scientific, provisional, public, and specialized libraries were merged into one, creating the largest cultural institution in Zeeland and one of the Netherlands major libraries.

Books & services
The library employs 180 staff and lends about 620,000 publications annually. It serves as a provincial service organization, advising institutions and other libraries, offering specialized services in all book-related areas.

Zeeland Library stages and develops cultural events, shows, and educational programs.

Opening hours
Zeeland Regional Library opens from:
 5:30-9:00 pm on Mondays
 10:00 am–9:00 pm Tuesday-Friday
 10:00 am–1:30 pm Saturdays

The library is closed on Sundays.

References

External links
Official Website of the Zeeland Library

Libraries in the Netherlands
Public libraries in the Netherlands
Culture of Zeeland
Buildings and structures in Middelburg, Zeeland